Alisma triviale, the northern water plantain, is a perennial semi-aquatic or aquatic plant in the water-plantain family (Alismataceae).

Description 

It is a perennial herb that ranges in height from 1-3 ft. Each plant has long-petioled, lanceolate and linear leaves that grow in a clump. A flowering stem rises between them. The flowers have 3 green sepals and 3 white or pink-tinged petals.

Distribution and habitat 
The plant is native to Canada (including the Northwest Territories), the United States (including Alaska), and Northern Mexico.

It grows in shallow water or mud.

References

External links
Calflora taxon report
 
Flore du Québec
Montana State  Government, Montana Field Guide
Connecticut Botanical Society

triviale
Flora of the United States
Flora of Canada
Flora of Mexico
Freshwater plants
Plants described in 1813